|}

The Earl of Sefton Stakes is a Group 3 flat horse race in Great Britain open to horses aged four years or older. It is run over a distance of 1 mile and 1 furlong (1,811 metres) on the Rowley Mile at Newmarket in mid-April.

History
The event was established in 1971, and it was initially called the Rubbing House Stakes. The first running was won by Pembroke Castle.

The race was renamed the Earl of Sefton Stakes in 1973 in memory of Hugh Molyneux (1898–1972), the seventh Earl of Sefton.

The Earl of Sefton Stakes is currently held on the firsts day of Newmarket's three-day Craven Meeting, the day before the Craven Stakes.

Records

Most successful horse (2 wins):
 Terimon – 1990, 1991
 Mull of Killough - 2013, 2014

Leading jockey (3 wins):
 Geoff Lewis – Pembroke Castle (1971), Owen Dudley (1974), Chil the Kite (1976)
 Joe Mercer – Jimsun (1975), Gunner B (1978), Legend of France (1984)
 Steve Cauthen – Hawaiian Sound (1979), Reprimand (1989), Sure Sharp (1992)
 Walter Swinburn – Hard Fought (1981), Ezzoud (1993), Desert Shot (1995)
 Pat Eddery – King of Clubs (1985), K-Battery (1987), Right Wing (2001)
 Michael Kinane – Luso (1996), Indian Lodge (2000), Notnowcato (2006)
 Kieren Fallon – Ali-Royal (1997), Shiva (1999), Olden Times (2003)
 William Buick -  Questioning (2012), French Navy (2015), Master Of The Seas (2022) 

Leading trainer (7 wins):
 Henry Cecil – Gunner B (1978), Ivano (1983), Legend of France (1984), Reprimand (1989), Ali-Royal (1997), Shiva (1999), Phoenix Tower (2008)

Winners

See also
 Horse racing in Great Britain
 List of British flat horse races
 Recurring sporting events established in 1971 – this race is included under its original title, Rubbing House Stakes.

References

 Paris-Turf:
 Racing Post:

 galopp-sieger.de – Earl of Sefton Stakes (ex Rubbing House Stakes).
 ifhaonline.org – International Federation of Horseracing Authorities – Earl of Sefton Stakes (2019).
 pedigreequery.com – Earl of Sefton Stakes – Newmarket.
 

Open mile category horse races
Newmarket Racecourse
Flat races in Great Britain